We Are Young Money is the first compilation album by American hip hop record label Young Money Entertainment, and released on December 21, 2009 by Young Money Entertainment, Cash Money Records and Universal Motown Records. The album garnered a positive reception but critics were divided on the quality of the label's choice of artists. We Are Young Money debuted at number 9 on the Billboard 200 and spawned three singles: "Every Girl", "BedRock" and "Roger That". The album was certified Platinum by the Recording Industry Association of America for sales of over 1,000,000 copies in the United States.

Background 
The album features contributions from Young Money artists Lil Wayne, Gudda Gudda, Jae Millz, Mack Maine, Drake, Tyga, T-Streets, Short Dawg, Shanell, Nicki Minaj, Lil Twist and Lil Chuckee. The album also features guest appearances from Birdman, Lloyd and Gucci Mane. The album's production was handled by Kane Beatz, Chase N. Cashe, Cool & Dre, David Banner, Infamous, Willy Will and DJ Mecca of The Audibles, among other high-profile record producers. Lil Wayne, the founder of the label, performs on all tracks, except "Girl I Got You".

Singles 
"Every Girl" was released as the album's lead single on June 11, 2009; the song features Lil Wayne, Drake, Jae Millz, Gudda Gudda and Mack Maine. The song peaked at number 10 on the US Billboard Hot 100. "BedRock" was released as the album's second single on November 14, 2009; the song features Lil Wayne, Drake, Jae Millz, Gudda Gudda, Nicki Minaj, Tyga and Lloyd. The song has peaked at number 2 on the US Billboard Hot 100 chart, and number 9 on the UK Singles Chart, making it the most commercially successful single. The two first singles proved to be hits on the charts and in the urban community. "Roger That" was released as the album's third single; the song features Lil Wayne, Nicki Minaj and Tyga. It was officially released to urban radio on March 23, 2010.

Other songs 
"Steady Mobbin'" peaked at number 48 on the Billboard Hot 100 in the United States. The song originally also featured 2 Chainz but he was removed for unknown reasons. It has been stated on MTV News that Gucci Mane and Lil Wayne shot their scenes for the video separately. Wayne shot his parts two-hours before turning himself in to his one-year jail sentence, while Gucci shot his after his sentence was completed on May 12, 2010. The music video premiered on Sunday July 4, 2010 on MTV Jams.

Critical reception 

We Are Young Money received generally favorable reviews from music critics who found the quality of the rappers' talents below average. At Metacritic, which assigns a normalized rating out of 100 to reviews from mainstream critics, the album received an average score of 63, based on 8 reviews.

Steve 'Flash' Juon of RapReviews praised the production by Kane Beatz and Tha Bizness for providing the necessary energy but found the album filled with more Lil Wayne and less of his newly signed roster than needed, saying that "For the most part the charisma of Lil Wayne and Drake carries We Are Young Money even when the actual content does not. Occasionally Jae Millz or Mack Maine upstage everyone with a line or two but odds are if you buy We Are Young Money you're a Lil Wayne fan." Pitchfork writer Ryan Dombal said that Drake and Nicki Minaj elevate the material that contains high quality production, saying that "Along with its top tier talents, what keeps WAYM from slogging along is a stylistic diversity and a selection of beats that sometimes borders on phenomenal." XXL contributor Chris Yuscavage praised the album for allowing new rappers to deliver workmanlike lyrics that rarely happen in similar projects, saying that "We Are Young Money—the first group project from Lil Wayne’s Young Money Entertainment—actually manages to help the YM roster make a solid first impression." Joshua Errett of NOW found Minaj the only standout rapper on the record because of her idiosyncratic delivery, saying that "Her nonsensical punchlines and train-wreck flow have been accurately described as Lynchian - kooky and captivating."

The A.V. Clubs Nathan Rabin found the album's lyrical content and roster of rappers tiring and lacking in staying power, concluding that "Money is pure bubblegum, the kind of instantly disposable pop ephemera listeners forget about while it’s still playing." Kathy Iandoli of HipHopDX found the record too Wayne-heavy and doesn't give enough time for the new rappers to leave an impression, saying that "[T]he problem here is that unlike past posse introductory albums (see Wu-Tang Clan’s Enter The 36 Chambers), there isn’t a level playing field where everyone has an equal opportunity to become a star. The individual successes of Wayne, Drake, and Nicki alone make a compilation like this too late for them and too early for the rest." Christian Hoard of Rolling Stone felt the album lacked balance in showcasing new artists, saying that "It's inconsistent, veering from Drake (always solid, but distracted here) to very average MCs like Gudda Gudda." Ashante Infantry of the Toronto Star said that despite appearances from Drake and Nicki Minaj, the rest of the label roster proved mediocre in delivering verses, saying that "[I]t's difficult to establish identity in an ensemble cast and even tougher with the limited, profane agenda – money, groupies, cars – outlined in songs like 'Fuck Da Bullshit' and 'New Shit'."

Commercial performance 
We Are Young Money debuted at number 9 on the US Billboard 200 chart, selling 142,000 copies in its first-week sales. The album was certified Gold by the Recording Industry Association of America (RIAA) for selling over a shipments of 500,000 copies in the United States.

Track listing 

Sample credits
 "Girl I Got You" contains a sample of "Escapade" as performed by Janet Jackson.

Personnel

 Kane Beatz – production (4, 9, 11, 13)
 B. Carr – production (5, 6, 8)
 Chase N. Cashe – production (5, 6, 8)
 Tha Bizness – production (2, 3)
 Cool & Dre – production (1)
 Willy Will – production (7)
 Halo – production (7)
 Pop Wansel – production (8)
 DJ Mecca – production (10)
 Mr. Pyro – production (10)
 Phenom – production (12)
 David Banner – production (14)
 Infamous – production (15)
 OnHel – production (15)

Charts

Weekly charts

Year-end charts

Certifications

References 

2009 compilation albums
Lil Wayne albums
Universal Motown Records albums
Young Money Entertainment compilation albums
Hip hop compilation albums
Record label compilation albums
Albums produced by Cool & Dre
Albums produced by David Banner
Albums produced by Kane Beatz
Albums produced by Tha Bizness
Cash Money Records compilation albums